Templin is a rural locality in the Scenic Rim Region, Queensland, Australia.

Geography 
The Boonah–Fassifern Road enters the locality from the south-east (Kents Pocket) and exits to west (Fassifern Valley).

History 
The locality was probably named by German settlers, William Gerner Zerner and Wilhelm F. Hohenhaus, both of whom came from Templin in Brandenburg, Prussia.

Templin State School opened on 18 January 1892 on land donated by Wilhelm Zerne in 1890. It closed on 31 December 1974. In 1975, the Fassifern District Historical Society took over the site to develop as the Templin Historical Village. Both the school building and the teacher's residence remain on the site.

In 1976, the former St John's Anglican Church was relocated from its original site in Cannon Creek to the Templin Historical Village. The church was built in 1911.

Heritage listings
Templin has the following heritage-listed sites:
 397 Boonah-Fassifern Road: former Templin State School

Education 
There are no schools in Templin. The nearest government primary schools are Kalbar State School in neighbouring Kalbar to the north-west and Boonah State School in Boonah to the south-west. The nearest government secondary school is Boonah State High School, also in Boonah.

Attractions 

The Templin Historical Village is at 397 Boonah-Fassifern Road; the museum is operated by the Fassifern Historical Society.

References

External links

Scenic Rim Region
Localities in Queensland